Oma Irama Penasaran is an Indonesian film directed by A. Harris and starring Rhoma Irama and Yati Octavia. According to Andrew N, Weintraub the film "paints a picture of an underclass boy who falls in love with a girl whose family is rich".

References

Indonesian romantic drama films
1976 films